Anil Ganguly (26 January 1933 – 15 January 2016) was an Indian film director and screenwriter, who worked in Hindi cinema from 1970s to 2001. He is best known for Jaya Bhaduri starrer, Kora Kagaz (1974) and the Rakhee starrer Tapasya (1975), both of which won the National Film Award for Best Popular Film Providing Wholesome Entertainment. He is also known for his films with Rakhee like Trishna, Aanchal, Saaheb (1985). Later in his career, after 1986 he made seven films none of which succeeded.

Career 
Ganguly started his career making literary adaptations with strong female roles and themes of marital discord. For his second film Kora Kagaz his adapted Ashutosh Mukhopadhyay's story "Saat Paake Bandha", previously adapted into a Bengali film by the same name. Films female lead Jaya Bhaduri won Filmfare Best Actress Award for her role. His next film, Tapasya (1975) with Raakhee as lead was produced by Rajshri Productions, and was based on story by Ashapurna Devi. Raakhee won the Filmfare Best Actress Award for her role He later adapted Sarat Chandra Chattopadhyay's novel Parineeta as Sankoch (1976), with Sulakshana Pandit and Jeetendra as leads. Humkadam again starring Raakhee, and made in 1980, was an adaptation of Satyajit Ray's Mahanagar.

He made Aanchal with Rajesh Khanna as the lead hero and the film turned out to be platinum jubilee hit. His last major film was Anil Kapoor and Amrita Singh starrer Saaheb (1985). Later in his career, he shifted to making action and thriller films but nine of 9 films he made since 1986 were unsuccessful at the box office. His last directorial venture was Bengali film Kiye Para Kiye Najara (1998) with Tapas Paul, and Debashree Roy. He died on 15 January 2016 at the age of 82.

Filmography 
 Half Ticket (1962) Assistant director
 Bheegi Raat (1965) Assistant director
 Kora Kagaz (1974)
 Tapasya (1975)
 Sankoch (1976)
 Trishna (1978)
 Khandaan (1979)
 Agreement (1980)
  Neeyat (1980)
 Aanchal (1980)
 Humkadam (1980)
 Karwat (1982)
 Kaun? Kaisey? (1983)
 Saaheb (1985)
 Mera Yaar Mera Dushman (1987)
 Pyar Ke Kabil (1987)
 Sadak Chhap (1987)
 Balidan (Bolidan) (1990, Bengali)
 Dushman Devta (1991)
 Dil Ki Baazi (1993)
 Angaara (1996)
 Kiye Para Kiye Nijara (1998, Odia)

Personal life 
His daughter, Rupali Ganguly is television, film and theatre actress. His son, Vijay Ganguly  is a director and choreographer.

Awards 
 National Film Award
 1974: Best Popular Film Providing Wholesome Entertainment: Kora Kagaz
 1975: Best Popular Film Providing Wholesome Entertainment: Tapasya

References

External links 
 
 

20th-century Indian film directors
Hindi-language film directors
Indian male screenwriters
2016 deaths
Film directors from Mumbai
Hindi film producers
Bengali film directors
1933 births
Directors who won the Best Popular Film Providing Wholesome Entertainment National Film Award
Film directors from Kolkata